Beopjeon-myeon (Hangeul: 법전면, Hanja: 法田面) is a myeon or a township in Bonghwa county of North Gyeongsang province in South Korea. The total area of Beopjeon-myeon is 70.22 square kilometers, and, as of 2006, the population was 2,368 people. Beopjeon-myeon is further divided into seven "ri", or small villages.

Administrative divisions
Beopjeon-ri (법전리)
Pungjeong-ri (풍정리)
Cheokgok-ri (척곡리)
Socheon-ri (소천리)
Nulsan-ri (눌산리)
Eoji-ri (어지리)
Soji-ri (소지리)

Schools
Beopjeon Elementary School(법전중앙초등학교) in Beopjeon-ri.
Beopjeon Middle School (법전중학교) in Beopjeon-ri.

Sources

External links
  Beopjeon-myeon Office Homepage
 Tourist Map of Bonghwa county including Beopjeon-myeon

Bonghwa County
Towns and townships in North Gyeongsang Province